The Northern Forest (Северный лес) is an off-road race in St. Petersburg, Russia. The event is part of the FIA World Cup for Cross-Country Bajas, and is part of the Russian national season. It is a rally raid event run on ice and snow in late February. Entrants need an FIA competition license.

The rally shares some of the sections that were used in the White Nights rally.

History
The race began in 2002 as a Russian Cup event. Two years later it became part of the Russian Championship. It became an international race in 2006, and it was added to the FIA calendar in 2007. In 2009, it was incorporated to the FIA World Cup for Cross-Country Bajas.

Winners

Eligible vehicles
Group T1: Improved Cross-Country Cars prepared according to the Appendix. «J» of the International Sporting Code Art. 285.

Classes:

T1.1  4x4 Gasoline

T1.2  4x4 Diesel

T1.3  4x2 Gasoline

T1.4  4x2 Diesel

Group T2: Cross-Country Series Production Cars prepared according to the Appendix. «J» of the International Sporting Code Art. 284.

Classes:

T2.1 Gasoline

T2.2 diesel

References

External links
Official website

Rally raid races
Motorsport competitions in Russia
Cross Country Rally World Cup races